The Neolithic period, or New Stone Age, is an Old World archaeological period and the final division of the Stone Age. It saw the Neolithic Revolution, a wide-ranging set of developments that appear to have arisen independently in several parts of the world. This "Neolithic package" included the introduction of farming, domestication of animals, and change from a hunter-gatherer lifestyle to one of settlement.

It began about 12,000 years ago when farming appeared in the Epipalaeolithic Near East, and later in other parts of the world. The Neolithic lasted in the Near East until the transitional period of the Chalcolithic (Copper Age) from about 6,500 years ago (4500 BC), marked by the development of metallurgy, leading up to the Bronze Age and Iron Age.

In other places the Neolithic followed the Mesolithic (Middle Stone Age) and then lasted until later. In Ancient Egypt, the Neolithic lasted until the Protodynastic period,  3150 BC. In China it lasted until circa 2000 BC with the rise of the pre-Shang Erlitou culture, and in Scandinavia the Neolithic lasted until about 2000 BC.

The term Neolithic is modern, based on Greek   'new' and   'stone', literally 'New Stone Age'. The term was coined by Sir John Lubbock in 1865 as a refinement of the three-age system.

Origin

Following the ASPRO chronology, the Neolithic started in around 10,200 BC in the Levant, arising from the Natufian culture, when pioneering use of wild cereals evolved into early farming. The Natufian period or "proto-Neolithic" lasted from 12,500 to 9,500 BC, and is taken to overlap with the Pre-Pottery Neolithic (PPNA) of 10,200–8800 BC. As the Natufians had become dependent on wild cereals in their diet, and a sedentary way of life had begun among them, the climatic changes associated with the Younger Dryas (about 10,000 BC) are thought to have forced people to develop farming.

By 10,200–8,800 BC farming communities had arisen in the Levant and spread to Asia Minor, North Africa and North Mesopotamia. Mesopotamia is the site of the earliest developments of the Neolithic Revolution from around 10,000 BC.

Early Neolithic farming was limited to a narrow range of plants, both wild and domesticated, which included einkorn wheat, millet and spelt, and the keeping of dogs. By about 8000 BC, it included domesticated sheep and goats, cattle and pigs.

Not all of these cultural elements characteristic of the Neolithic appeared everywhere in the same order: the earliest farming societies in the Near East did not use pottery. In other parts of the world, such as Africa, South Asia and Southeast Asia, independent domestication events led to their own regionally distinctive Neolithic cultures, which arose completely independently of those in Europe and Southwest Asia. Early Japanese societies and other East Asian cultures used pottery before developing agriculture.

Periods by region

Southwest Asia

In the Middle East, cultures identified as Neolithic began appearing in the 10th millennium BC. Early development occurred in the Levant (e.g. Pre-Pottery Neolithic A and Pre-Pottery Neolithic B) and from there spread eastwards and westwards. Neolithic cultures are also attested in southeastern Anatolia and northern Mesopotamia by around 8000 BC.

Anatolian Neolithic farmers derived a significant portion of their ancestry from the Anatolian hunter-gatherers (AHG), suggesting that agriculture was adopted in site by these hunter-gatherers and not spread by demic diffusion into the region.

Pre-Pottery Neolithic A 

The Neolithic 1 (PPNA) period began roughly around 10,000 BC in the Levant. A temple area in southeastern Turkey at Göbekli Tepe, dated to around 9500 BC, may be regarded as the beginning of the period. This site was developed by nomadic hunter-gatherer tribes, as evidenced by the lack of permanent housing in the vicinity, and may be the oldest known human-made place of worship. At least seven stone circles, covering , contain limestone pillars carved with animals, insects, and birds. Stone tools were used by perhaps as many as hundreds of people to create the pillars, which might have supported roofs. Other early PPNA sites dating to around 9500–9000 BC have been found in Tell es-Sultan (ancient Jericho), Israel (notably Ain Mallaha, Nahal Oren, and Kfar HaHoresh), Gilgal in the Jordan Valley, and Byblos, Lebanon. The start of Neolithic 1 overlaps the Tahunian and Heavy Neolithic periods to some degree.

The major advance of Neolithic 1 was true farming. In the proto-Neolithic Natufian cultures, wild cereals were harvested, and perhaps early seed selection and re-seeding occurred. The grain was ground into flour. Emmer wheat was domesticated, and animals were herded and domesticated (animal husbandry and selective breeding).

In 2006, remains of figs were discovered in a house in Jericho dated to 9400 BC. The figs are of a mutant variety that cannot be pollinated by insects, and therefore the trees can only reproduce from cuttings. This evidence suggests that figs were the first cultivated crop and mark the invention of the technology of farming. This occurred centuries before the first cultivation of grains.

Settlements became more permanent, with circular houses, much like those of the Natufians, with single rooms. However, these houses were for the first time made of mudbrick. The settlement had a surrounding stone wall and perhaps a stone tower (as in Jericho). The wall served as protection from nearby groups, as protection from floods, or to keep animals penned. Some of the enclosures also suggest grain and meat storage.

Pre-Pottery Neolithic B 

The Neolithic 2 (PPNB) began around 8800 BC according to the ASPRO chronology in the Levant (Jericho, West Bank). As with the PPNA dates, there are two versions from the same laboratories noted above. This system of terminology, however, is not convenient for southeast Anatolia and settlements of the middle Anatolia basin. A settlement of 3,000 inhabitants was found in the outskirts of Amman, Jordan. Considered to be one of the largest prehistoric settlements in the Near East, called 'Ain Ghazal, it was continuously inhabited from approximately 7250 BC to approximately 5000 BC.

Settlements have rectangular mud-brick houses where the family lived together in single or multiple rooms. Burial findings suggest an ancestor cult where people preserved skulls of the dead, which were plastered with mud to make facial features. The rest of the corpse could have been left outside the settlement to decay until only the bones were left, then the bones were buried inside the settlement underneath the floor or between houses.

Pre-Pottery Neolithic C

Work at the site of 'Ain Ghazal in Jordan has indicated a later Pre-Pottery Neolithic C period. Juris Zarins has proposed that a Circum Arabian Nomadic Pastoral Complex developed in the period from the climatic crisis of 6200 BC, partly as a result of an increasing emphasis in PPNB cultures upon domesticated animals, and a fusion with Harifian hunter gatherers in the Southern Levant, with affiliate connections with the cultures of Fayyum and the Eastern Desert of Egypt. Cultures practicing this lifestyle spread down the Red Sea shoreline and moved east from Syria into southern Iraq.

Late Neolithic 

The Late Neolithic began around 6,400 BC in the Fertile Crescent. By then distinctive cultures emerged, with pottery like the Halafian (Turkey, Syria, Northern Mesopotamia) and Ubaid (Southern Mesopotamia). This period has been further divided into PNA (Pottery Neolithic A) and PNB (Pottery Neolithic B) at some sites.

The Chalcolithic (Stone-Bronze) period began about 4500 BC, then the Bronze Age began about 3500 BC, replacing the Neolithic cultures.

Fertile Crescent 

Around 10,000 BC the first fully developed Neolithic cultures belonging to the phase Pre-Pottery Neolithic A (PPNA) appeared in the Fertile Crescent. The settlement included two temples dating to 9650 BC. Around 9000 BC during the PPNA, one of the world's first towns, Jericho, appeared in the Levant. It was surrounded by a stone wall, may have contained a population of up to 2,000–3,000 people, and contained a massive stone tower. Around 6400 BC the Halaf culture appeared in Syria and Northern Mesopotamia.

In 1981, a team of researchers from the Maison de l'Orient et de la Méditerranée, including Jacques Cauvin and Oliver Aurenche, divided Near East Neolithic chronology into ten periods (0 to 9) based on social, economic and cultural characteristics. In 2002, Danielle Stordeur and Frédéric Abbès advanced this system with a division into five periods.
 Natufian between 12,000 and 10,200 BC,
 Khiamian between 10,200 and 8800 BC, PPNA: Sultanian (Jericho), Mureybetian,
 Early PPNB (PPNB ancien) between 8800 and 7600 BC, middle PPNB (PPNB moyen) between 7600 and 6900 BC,
 Late PPNB (PPNB récent) between 7500 and 7000 BC,
 A PPNB (sometimes called PPNC) transitional stage (PPNB final) in which Halaf and dark faced burnished ware begin to emerge between 6900 and 6400 BC.
They also advanced the idea of a transitional stage between the PPNA and PPNB between 8800 and 8600 BC at sites like Jerf el Ahmar and Tell Aswad.

Southern Mesopotamia 
Alluvial plains (Sumer/Elam). Low rainfall makes irrigation systems necessary. Ubaid culture from 6,900 BC.

North Africa 

Domestication of sheep and goats reached Egypt from the Near East possibly as early as 6000 BC. Graeme Barker states "The first indisputable evidence for domestic plants and animals in the Nile valley is not until the early fifth millennium BC in northern Egypt and a thousand years later further south, in both cases as part of strategies that still relied heavily on fishing, hunting, and the gathering of wild plants" and suggests that these subsistence changes were not due to farmers migrating from the Near East but was an indigenous development, with cereals either indigenous or obtained through exchange. Other scholars argue that the primary stimulus for agriculture and domesticated animals (as well as mud-brick architecture and other Neolithic cultural features) in Egypt was from the Middle East.

Sub-Saharan Africa 

The Pastoral Neolithic refers to a period in Africa's prehistory marking the beginning of food production on the continent following the Later Stone Age. In contrast to the Neolithic in other parts of the world, which saw the development of farming societies, the first form of African food production was mobile pastoralism, or ways of life centered on the herding and management of livestock. The term "Pastoral Neolithic" is used most often by archaeologists to describe early pastoralist periods in the Sahara, as well as in eastern Africa.

The Savanna Pastoral Neolithic or SPN (formerly known as the Stone Bowl Culture) is a collection of ancient societies that appeared in the Rift Valley of East Africa and surrounding areas during a time period known as the Pastoral Neolithic. They were South Cushitic speaking pastoralists, who tended to bury their dead in cairns whilst their toolkit was characterized by stone bowls, pestles, grindstones and earthenware pots. Through archaeology, historical linguistics and archaeogenetics, they conventionally have been identified with the area's first Afroasiatic-speaking settlers. Archaeological dating of livestock bones and burial cairns has also established the cultural complex as the earliest center of pastoralism and stone construction in the region.

Europe 

In southeast Europe agrarian societies first appeared in the 7th millennium BC, attested by one of the earliest farming sites of Europe, discovered in Vashtëmi, southeastern Albania and dating back to 6500 BC. In most of Western Europe in followed over the next two thousand years, but in some parts of Northwest Europe it is much later, lasting just under 3,000 years from c. 4500 BC–1700 BC. Recent advances in archaeogenetics have confirmed that the spread of agriculture from the Middle East to Europe was strongly correlated with the migration of early farmers from Anatolia about 9,000 years ago, and was not just a cultural exchange.

Anthropomorphic figurines have been found in the Balkans from 6000 BC, and in Central Europe by around 5800 BC (La Hoguette). Among the earliest cultural complexes of this area are the Sesklo culture in Thessaly, which later expanded in the Balkans giving rise to Starčevo-Körös (Cris), Linearbandkeramik, and Vinča. Through a combination of cultural diffusion and migration of peoples, the Neolithic traditions spread west and northwards to reach northwestern Europe by around 4500 BC. The Vinča culture may have created the earliest system of writing, the Vinča signs, though archaeologist Shan Winn believes they most likely represented pictograms and ideograms rather than a truly developed form of writing.

The Cucuteni-Trypillian culture built enormous settlements in Romania, Moldova and Ukraine from 5300 to 2300 BC. The megalithic temple complexes of Ġgantija on the Mediterranean island of Gozo (in the Maltese archipelago) and of Mnajdra (Malta) are notable for their gigantic Neolithic structures, the oldest of which date back to around 3600 BC. The Hypogeum of Ħal-Saflieni, Paola, Malta, is a subterranean structure excavated around 2500 BC; originally a sanctuary, it became a necropolis, the only prehistoric underground temple in the world, and shows a degree of artistry in stone sculpture unique in prehistory to the Maltese islands. After 2500 BC, these islands were depopulated for several decades until the arrival of a new influx of Bronze Age immigrants, a culture that cremated its dead and introduced smaller megalithic structures called dolmens to Malta. In most cases there are small chambers here, with the cover made of a large slab placed on upright stones. They are claimed to belong to a population different from that which built the previous megalithic temples. It is presumed the population arrived from Sicily because of the similarity of Maltese dolmens to some small constructions found there.

With some exceptions, population levels rose rapidly at the beginning of the Neolithic until they reached the carrying capacity. This was followed by a population crash of "enormous magnitude" after 5000 BC, with levels remaining low during the next 1,500 years. Populations began to rise after 3500 BCE, with further dips and rises occurring between 3000 and 2500 BC but varying in date between regions. Around this time is the Neolithic decline, when populations collapsed across most of Europe, possibly caused by climatic conditions, plague, or mass migration.

South and East Asia 

Settled life, encompassing the transition from foraging to farming and pastoralism, began in South Asia in the region of Balochistan, Pakistan, around 7,000 BC.  At the site of Mehrgarh, Balochistan, presence can be documented of the domestication of wheat and barley, rapidly followed by that of goats, sheep, and cattle.   In April 2006, it was announced in the scientific journal Nature that the oldest (and first early Neolithic) evidence for the drilling of teeth in vivo (using bow drills and flint tips) was found in Mehrgarh. 

In South India, the Neolithic began by 6500 BC and lasted until around 1400 BC when the Megalithic transition period began. South Indian Neolithic is characterized by Ash mounds from 2500 BC in Karnataka region, expanded later to Tamil Nadu.

In East Asia, the earliest sites include the Nanzhuangtou culture around 9500–9000 BC, Pengtoushan culture around 7500–6100 BC, and Peiligang culture around 7000–5000 BC. The prehistoric Beifudi site near Yixian in Hebei Province, China, contains relics of a culture contemporaneous with the Cishan and Xinglongwa cultures of about 6000–5000 BC, Neolithic cultures east of the Taihang Mountains, filling in an archaeological gap between the two Northern Chinese cultures. Between 3000 and 1900 BC, the Longshan culture existed in the middle and lower Yellow River valley areas of northern China. Towards the end of the 3rd millennium BC, the population decreased sharply in most of the region and many of the larger centres were abandoned, possibly due to environmental change linked to the end of the Holocene Climatic Optimum.

The 'Neolithic' (defined in this paragraph as using polished stone implements) remains a living tradition in small and extremely remote and inaccessible pockets of West Papua (Indonesian New Guinea). Polished stone adze and axes are used in the present day in areas where the availability of metal implements is limited. This is likely to cease altogether in the next few years as the older generation die off and steel blades and chainsaws prevail.

In 2012, news was released about a new farming site discovered in Munam-ri, Goseong, Gangwon Province, South Korea, which may be the earliest farmland known to date in east Asia. "No remains of an agricultural field from the Neolithic period have been found in any East Asian country before, the institute said, adding that the discovery reveals that the history of agricultural cultivation at least began during the period on the Korean Peninsula". The farm was dated between 3600 and 3000 BC. Pottery, stone projectile points, and possible houses were also found. "In 2002, researchers discovered prehistoric earthenware, jade earrings, among other items in the area". The research team will perform accelerator mass spectrometry (AMS) dating to retrieve a more precise date for the site.

The Americas 
In Mesoamerica, a similar set of events (i.e., crop domestication and sedentary lifestyles) occurred by around 4500 BC, but possibly as early as 11,000–10,000 BC. These cultures are usually not referred to as belonging to the Neolithic; in America different terms are used such as Formative stage instead of mid-late Neolithic, Archaic Era instead of Early Neolithic, and Paleo-Indian for the preceding period.

The Formative stage is equivalent to the Neolithic Revolution period in Europe, Asia, and Africa. In the southwestern United States it occurred from 500 to 1200 AD when there was a dramatic increase in population and development of large villages supported by agriculture based on dryland farming of maize, and later, beans, squash, and domesticated turkeys. During this period the bow and arrow and ceramic pottery were also introduced.  In later periods cities of considerable size developed, and some metallurgy by 700 BC.

Australia
Australia, in contrast to New Guinea, has generally been held not to have had a Neolithic period, with a hunter-gatherer lifestyle continuing until the arrival of Europeans. This view can be challenged in terms of the definition of agriculture, but "Neolithic" remains a rarely used and not very useful concept in discussing Australian prehistory.

Cultural characteristics

Social organization 
	

During most of the Neolithic age of Eurasia, people lived in small tribes composed of multiple bands or lineages. There is little scientific evidence of developed social stratification in most Neolithic societies; social stratification is more associated with the later Bronze Age. Although some late Eurasian Neolithic societies formed complex stratified chiefdoms or even states, generally states evolved in Eurasia only with the rise of metallurgy, and most Neolithic societies on the whole were relatively simple and egalitarian. Beyond Eurasia, however, states were formed during the local Neolithic in three areas, namely in the Preceramic Andes with the Norte Chico Civilization, Formative Mesoamerica and Ancient Hawaiʻi. However, most Neolithic societies were noticeably more hierarchical than the Upper Paleolithic cultures that preceded them and hunter-gatherer cultures in general.

The domestication of large animals (c. 8000 BC) resulted in a dramatic increase in social inequality in most of the areas where it occurred; New Guinea being a notable exception. Possession of livestock allowed competition between households and resulted in inherited inequalities of wealth. Neolithic pastoralists who controlled large herds gradually acquired more livestock, and this made economic inequalities more pronounced. However, evidence of social inequality is still disputed, as settlements such as Çatalhöyük reveal a striking lack of difference in the size of homes and burial sites, suggesting a more egalitarian society with no evidence of the concept of capital, although some homes do appear slightly larger or more elaborately decorated than others.

Families and households were still largely independent economically, and the household was probably the center of life. However, excavations in Central Europe have revealed that early Neolithic Linear Ceramic cultures ("Linearbandkeramik") were building large arrangements of circular ditches between 4800 and 4600 BC. These structures (and their later counterparts such as causewayed enclosures, burial mounds, and henge) required considerable time and labour to construct, which suggests that some influential individuals were able to organise and direct human labour – though non-hierarchical and voluntary work remain possibilities.

There is a large body of evidence for fortified settlements at Linearbandkeramik sites along the Rhine, as at least some villages were fortified for some time with a palisade and an outer ditch. Settlements with palisades and weapon-traumatized bones, such as those found at the Talheim Death Pit, have been discovered and demonstrate that "...systematic violence between groups" and warfare was probably much more common during the Neolithic than in the preceding Paleolithic period. This supplanted an earlier view of the Linear Pottery Culture as living a "peaceful, unfortified lifestyle".

Control of labour and inter-group conflict is characteristic of tribal groups with social rank that are headed by a charismatic individual – either a 'big man' or a proto-chief – functioning as a lineage-group head. Whether a non-hierarchical system of organization existed is debatable, and there is no evidence that explicitly suggests that Neolithic societies functioned under any dominating class or individual, as was the case in the chiefdoms of the European Early Bronze Age. Possible exceptions to this include Iraq during the Ubaid period and England beginning in the Early Neolithic (4100-3000 BC). Theories to explain the apparent implied egalitarianism of Neolithic (and Paleolithic) societies have arisen, notably the Marxist concept of primitive communism.

Shelter and sedentism

The shelter of the early people changed dramatically from the Upper Paleolithic to the Neolithic era. In the Paleolithic, people did not normally live in permanent constructions. In the Neolithic, mud brick houses started appearing that were coated with plaster. The growth of agriculture made permanent houses possible. Doorways were made on the roof, with ladders positioned both on the inside and outside of the houses. The roof was supported by beams from the inside. The rough ground was covered by platforms, mats, and skins on which residents slept. Stilt-house settlements were common in the Alpine and Pianura Padana (Terramare) region. Remains have been found in the Ljubljana Marsh in Slovenia and at the Mondsee and Attersee lakes in Upper Austria, for example.

Agriculture 

A significant and far-reaching shift in human subsistence and lifestyle was to be brought about in areas where crop farming and cultivation were first developed: the previous reliance on an essentially nomadic hunter-gatherer subsistence technique or pastoral transhumance was at first supplemented, and then increasingly replaced by, a reliance upon the foods produced from cultivated lands. These developments are also believed to have greatly encouraged the growth of settlements, since it may be supposed that the increased need to spend more time and labor in tending crop fields required more localized dwellings. This trend would continue into the Bronze Age, eventually giving rise to permanently settled farming towns, and later cities and states whose larger populations could be sustained by the increased productivity from cultivated lands.

The profound differences in human interactions and subsistence methods associated with the onset of early agricultural practices in the Neolithic have been called the Neolithic Revolution, a term coined in the 1920s by the Australian archaeologist Vere Gordon Childe.

One potential benefit of the development and increasing sophistication of farming technology was the possibility of producing surplus crop yields, in other words, food supplies in excess of the immediate needs of the community. Surpluses could be stored for later use, or possibly traded for other necessities or luxuries. Agricultural life afforded securities that nomadic life could not, and sedentary farming populations grew faster than nomadic.

However, early farmers were also adversely affected in times of famine, such as may be caused by drought or pests. In instances where agriculture had become the predominant way of life, the sensitivity to these shortages could be particularly acute, affecting agrarian populations to an extent that otherwise may not have been routinely experienced by prior hunter-gatherer communities. Nevertheless, agrarian communities generally proved successful, and their growth and the expansion of territory under cultivation continued.

Another significant change undergone by many of these newly agrarian communities was one of diet. Pre-agrarian diets varied by region, season, available local plant and animal resources and degree of pastoralism and hunting. Post-agrarian diet was restricted to a limited package of successfully cultivated cereal grains, plants and to a variable extent domesticated animals and animal products. Supplementation of diet by hunting and gathering was to variable degrees precluded by the increase in population above the carrying capacity of the land and a high sedentary local population concentration. In some cultures, there would have been a significant shift toward increased starch and plant protein. The relative nutritional benefits and drawbacks of these dietary changes and their overall impact on early societal development are still debated.

In addition, increased population density, decreased population mobility, increased continuous proximity to domesticated animals, and continuous occupation of comparatively population-dense sites would have altered sanitation needs and patterns of disease.

Lithic technology 

The identifying characteristic of Neolithic technology is the use of polished or ground stone tools, in contrast to the flaked stone tools used during the Paleolithic era.

Neolithic people were skilled farmers, manufacturing a range of tools necessary for the tending, harvesting and processing of crops (such as sickle blades and grinding stones) and food production (e.g. pottery, bone implements). They were also skilled manufacturers of a range of other types of stone tools and ornaments, including projectile points, beads, and statuettes. But what allowed forest clearance on a large scale was the polished stone axe above all other tools. Together with the adze, fashioning wood for shelter, structures and canoes for example, this enabled them to exploit their newly won farmland.

Neolithic peoples in the Levant, Anatolia, Syria, northern Mesopotamia and Central Asia were also accomplished builders, utilizing mud-brick to construct houses and villages. At Çatalhöyük, houses were plastered and painted with elaborate scenes of humans and animals. In Europe, long houses built from wattle and daub were constructed. Elaborate tombs were built for the dead. These tombs are particularly numerous in Ireland, where there are many thousand still in existence. Neolithic people in the British Isles built long barrows and chamber tombs for their dead and causewayed camps, henges, flint mines and cursus monuments. It was also important to figure out ways of preserving food for future months, such as fashioning relatively airtight containers, and using substances like salt as preservatives.

The peoples of the Americas and the Pacific mostly retained the Neolithic level of tool technology until the time of European contact. Exceptions include copper hatchets and spearheads in the Great Lakes region.

Clothing 
Most clothing appears to have been made of animal skins, as indicated by finds of large numbers of bone and antler pins that are ideal for fastening leather. Wool cloth and linen might have become available during the later Neolithic, as suggested by finds of perforated stones that (depending on size) may have served as spindle whorls or loom weights.

List of early settlements 

Neolithic human settlements include:

The world's oldest known engineered roadway, the Post Track in England, dates from 3838 BC and the world's oldest freestanding structure is the Neolithic temple of Ġgantija in Gozo, Malta.

List of cultures and sites 

Note: Dates are very approximate, and are only given for a rough estimate; consult each culture for specific time periods.

Early Neolithic 
Periodization: The Levant: 9500–8000 BC; Europe: 5000–4000 BC; Elsewhere: varies greatly, depending on region.
 Pre-Pottery Neolithic A (Levant, 9500–8000 BC)
 Nanzhuangtou (China, 8500 BC)
 Franchthi Cave (Greece, 7000 BC)
 Cishan culture (China, 6500–5000 BC)
 Sesclo village (Greece, c. 6300 BC)
 Starcevo-Criş culture (Starčevo-Körös-Criş culture) (Balkans, 5800–4500 BC)
 Katundas Cavern (Albania, 6th millennium BC)
 Dudeşti culture (Romania, 6th millennium BC)
 Beixin culture (China, 5300–4100 BC)
 Tamil Nadu culture  (India, 3000–2800 BC)
 Mentesh Tepe and Kamiltepe (Azerbaijan, 7000–3000 BC)

Middle Neolithic
Periodization: The Levant: 8000–6000 BC; Europe: 4000–3500 BC; Elsewhere: varies greatly, depending on region.

Later Neolithic 
Periodization: 6500–4500 BC; Europe: 3500–3000 BC; Elsewhere: varies greatly, depending on region.
 Pottery Neolithic (Fertile Crescent, 6400 – 4500 BC)
 Halaf culture (Mesopotamia, 6100 BC and 5100 BC)
 Halaf-Ubaid Transitional period (Mesopotamia, 5500–5000 BC)
 Ubaid 1/2 (5400–4500 BC)
 Funnelbeaker culture (North/Eastern Europe, 4300–2800 BC)

 Chalcolithic

Periodization: Near East: 4500–3300 BC; Europe: 3000–1700 BC; Elsewhere: varies greatly, depending on region. In the Americas, the Eneolithic ended as late as the 19th century AD for some peoples.
 Ubaid 3/4 (Mesopotamia, 4500–4000 BC)
 early Uruk period (Mesopotamia, 4000–3800 BC)
 middle Uruk period (Mesopotamia, 3800–3400 BC)
 late Trypillian (Eastern Europe, 3000–2750 BC)
 Gaudo Culture (Italy, 3150–2950 BC)
 Corded Ware culture (North/Eastern Europe, 2900–2350)
 Beaker culture (Central/Western Europe, 2900–1800 BC)

Comparative chronology

See also

Notes

References

Citations

Sources

External links 

 Romeo, Nick (Feb. 2015). Embracing Stone Age Couple Found in Greek Cave. "Rare double burials discovered at one of the largest Neolithic burial sites in Europe." National Geographic Society
 
 
 
 Current Directions in West African Prehistory – McIntosh & McIntosh (1983)
 

 
1860s neologisms
Holocene
Historical eras